Johnny Eager is a 1941 film noir directed by Mervyn LeRoy and starring Robert Taylor, Lana Turner and Van Heflin. Heflin won an Academy Award for Best Supporting Actor. The film was one of many spoofed in Dead Men Don't Wear Plaid (1982).

Plot
Johnny Eager (Robert Taylor) masquerades as a taxi driver for his gullible parole officer, A. J. Verne (Henry O'Neill), but in reality, he is the ruthless head of a powerful gambling syndicate. Verne introduces him to socialite Lisbeth "Liz" Bard (Lana Turner), a sociology student. Johnny and Liz are attracted to each other, but then he discovers that she is the stepdaughter of his longtime nemesis, John Benson Farrell (Edward Arnold). As a crusading prosecutor, Farrell was responsible for sending Johnny to prison, and now as the district attorney, he has gotten an injunction preventing Johnny's expensive dog racing track from opening.

Johnny decides to use Liz as leverage against her stepfather. When she comes to see him, he has Julio (Paul Stewart), one of his underlings, burst in and pretend to try to kill him. During the faked struggle, Julio drops his gun. Lisbeth picks it up and shoots Julio when he seems to have the upper hand. Johnny then hustles her out of the room before she can realize that the gun is full of blanks and Julio's blood is actually ketchup. Later, Johnny threatens to expose her as a murderer unless Farrell removes the injunction. Farrell gives in.

Johnny is depicted as a man without a conscience. When childhood friend Lew Rankin (Barry Nelson) gets fed up with his subordinate role in the gang and starts plotting against him, Johnny murders him without the slightest qualm. He lies to his devoted girlfriend Garnet (Patricia Dane) to get her to go to Florida while he romances Liz. Mae (Glenda Farrell), a prior girlfriend, asks him to help get her incorruptible policeman husband transferred back to his old precinct because his long commute is straining their marriage. Johnny not only lies, claiming he no longer has any influence, he also hides the fact that he got the man transferred in the first place because he would not look the other way. When Jimmy Courtney (Robert Sterling), Liz's high society former boyfriend, becomes alarmed because Liz is going to pieces due to a guilty conscience, he offers Johnny all his money to leave the country and take Liz with him. Johnny cannot figure out his "angle", why he would do such a selfless thing. In fact, the only soft spot Johnny seems to have is for his intellectual, alcoholic right-hand man, Jeff Hartnett (Van Heflin), and even he is not sure why. Jeff has an insight, telling his boss that "even Johnny Eager has to have one friend."

However, when Johnny learns that Liz intends to turn herself in, he discovers the meaning of love for the first time in his life. He confesses to her that he staged the whole incident, but she does not believe him. To prove his claim, he decides to produce a live Julio, but Julio has defected to Johnny's dissatisfied partner, Bill Halligan (Cy Kendall). Johnny manages to bring Julio (at gunpoint) to Liz, but in the process he shoves Johnny and runs away. Johnny forces Liz and Courtney to flee to safety before the gunfight with Halligan and his men. Eager kills Halligan and Julio, but is spotted by a policeman as he attempts to flee and is shot down. Jeff arrives and embraces Johnny as he finally dies.

The policeman, in a twist of fate, turns out to be Mae's husband.

Cast

 Robert Taylor as Johnny Eager
 Lana Turner as Lisbeth Bard
 Edward Arnold as John Benson Farrell
 Van Heflin as Jeff Hartnett
 Robert Sterling as Jimmy Courtney
 Patricia Dane as Garnet
 Glenda Farrell as Mae Blythe
 Henry O'Neill as A.J. Verne
 Diana Lewis as Judy Sanford
 Barry Nelson as Lew Rankin
 Charles Dingle as A. Frazier Marco

 Paul Stewart as Julio
 Cy Kendall as Bill Halligan
 Don Costello as Billiken
 Lou Lubin as Benjy
 Joe Downing as Ryan
 Connie Gilchrist as Peg Fowler
 Robin Raymond as Matilda "Matty" Fowler
 Leona Maricle as Miss Mines
 Emory Parnell as Policeman
 Byron Shores as Officer 711 (Mae's husband)

Reception

Box office
According to MGM records the film earned $1,596,000 in the US and Canada and $990,000 elsewhere resulting in a profit of $1,110,000.

Critical response
The New York Times film critic called the film "a tight tale of underworld terror that drives hard—even in the clinches" and, though not a "serious drama", "as pure melodrama 'Johnny Eager' moves at a turbulent tempo" .... "Mr. Taylor and Miss Turner strike sparks in their distraught love affair. Van Heflin provides a sardonic portrait of Johnny's Boswell, full of long words and fancy quotations."

Emanuel Levy was less enthused, complaining that the plot "fails to make any sense." However, he complimented Van Heflin for "stealing every scene he is in".

Variety magazine reported, "Johnny Eager is an underworld meller with a few new twists to the usual trappings, but by and large it's the familiar tale ... of slick gangster vs innocent rich girl." However, the reviewer praised all three leads, singling Van Heflin out as "outstanding".

References

External links
 
 
 
 
 

1942 films
American black-and-white films
1940s English-language films
Film noir
Films directed by Mervyn LeRoy
Films featuring a Best Supporting Actor Academy Award-winning performance
Films scored by Bronisław Kaper
Metro-Goldwyn-Mayer films
1940s crime drama films
American crime drama films
1941 drama films
1941 films
1942 drama films
1940s American films